Rodney Francis Nugent, OAM (born 26 November 1967) is an Australian Paralympic athlete.

Personal
Nugent was born on 26 November 1967 in the northern New South Wales city of Lismore. At the age of 15, he lost the lower portion of his right arm in an industrial accident with a mincing machine . Before the accident, Nugent enjoyed sport and played soccer and cricket. The accident did not stop his love of sport and he turned his focus to athletics and coaching.

He is married and has three sons.

Career

At the 1988 Seoul Paralympics, Nugent entered seven events and won four gold (long jump, triple jump, 4x 100 m Relay, and 4 x 400 m Relay) and three bronze medals (100 m, 200 m and high jump). He broke three world records. 

At the World Championships and Games for the Disabled in Assen, Netherlands he won gold medals in the men's triple jump 9F and men's 4x100 m relay 3T, silver medals in the men's 100 m 6T and men's high jump 9F and bronze medal in men's long jump 9F.

In 1992, he accepted a scholarship in the newly established Australian Institute of Sport (AIS) Athletes with a Disabilities program and was coached by Chris Nunn. In joining the AIS program, Nugent commented "It’s very hard for athletes to finance their own training – I did it for years and it was tough. Getting this scholarship with the AIS has made all the difference. The facilities are good and the training program is excellent".

Nugent won a  gold medal at the 1992 Barcelona Games in the Men's 4x100 m Relay TS2,4 event, a world record.  He also competed in the 100 m, 200 m, long jump and triple jump. He left the AIS program after the 1992 Barcelona Paralympics. 

In two Paralympics, Nugent won five gold and three bronze medals.

In an interview in 2011, Nugent commented that sport allowed him to achieve the goals he had as an able bodied athlete and played a significant role in his rehabilitation. 

Nugent is currently with Mid North Coast Special Olympics as public relations officer and coaching Special Olympic athletes Bennett Powell and Josh Southgate in Port Macquarie. He is the Australian special olympics head athletics coach and has also filled this role at the state level for New South Wales.

Awards

Daily Examiner Sports Star of the Year Award -  1986, 1987 & 1988
Medal of the Order of Australia (1993) for his 1992 gold medal
Clarence Valley Council Sporting Wall of Fame induction in 2002.

References

1967 births
Living people
People from the Mid North Coast
Paralympic athletes of Australia
Athletes (track and field) at the 1988 Summer Paralympics
Athletes (track and field) at the 1992 Summer Paralympics
Medalists at the 1988 Summer Paralympics
Medalists at the 1992 Summer Paralympics
Paralympic gold medalists for Australia
Paralympic bronze medalists for Australia
Australian amputees
Sprinters with limb difference
High jumpers with limb difference
Long jumpers with limb difference
Triple jumpers with limb difference
Paralympic sprinters
Paralympic high jumpers
Paralympic long jumpers
Paralympic triple jumpers
Recipients of the Medal of the Order of Australia
Australian Institute of Sport Paralympic track and field athletes
Paralympic medalists in athletics (track and field)
Australian male sprinters
Australian male high jumpers
Australian male long jumpers
Australian male triple jumpers
Sportsmen from New South Wales